Asmara International Airport, is the international airport of Asmara, the capital of Eritrea. It is the country's largest airport and, as of 2017, the only one receiving regularly scheduled services.

History

The airport was constructed by the Italian colonial authorities in 1922, the first such facility to be opened in Italian Eritrea with the name "Aeroporto di Gura". It served as the main military airport in the territory. In the mid-1930s, the airport (enlarged and now called Aeroporto Civile Umberto Maddalena di Asmara) began offering civilian and commercial flights.

On 7 July 1935, an agreement was signed with British "Imperial Airways" to connect Asmara to Khartoum. A regular Kassala-Khartoum-Asmara-Massawa 770 km commercial route was subsequently started with a Caproni 133 of the Italian Ala Littoria.

Additionally, a regular Asmara-Assab- Mogadishu commercial route was started in summer 1935, with an Ala Littoria's Caproni Ca.133 providing 13-hour flights from the Mogadishu airport to Italian Eritrea. The aircraft had a maximal capacity of 18 passengers, which at the time was a record.

In 1936, Ala Littoria launched an intercontinental connection -called "Linea dell'Impero"- between Mogadishu-Asmara-Khartoum-Tripoli and Rome. The voyage lasted four days and was one of the first long range flights in the world.

During World War II, the airport was nearly destroyed by the British. It was later renovated in the 1950s, and reopened to offer flights to Addis Ababa and other cities in Ethiopia. With Eritrea's independence in the 1990s, the airport became an international portal to the new nation.

During the Eritrean-Ethiopian War, the airport was bombed two times by Ethiopia. The first was in 1998 and another in 2000. In April 2003, after improvements to the airport's runways, Eritrean Airlines started regular services between Asmara and Frankfurt, Milan, Nairobi and Rome. In 2004, it served 136,526 passengers (+11.8% vs. 2003). in 2018, after renewed relations with Ethiopia, the airport started accepting flights from Addis Ababa for the first time since the war.

Facilities
The airport has capacity restrictions due to its small terminal, short runway and high 1.5-mile (2300m.) altitude. Consequently, some large jet aircraft (like an A380, MD-11 or 747) cannot fly to the airport. Unsuitable aircraft would instead need to use the Massawa International Airport on the Eritrean coast. Lufthansa, however, operated Airbus A340 aircraft on a FRA-JED-ASM service as recently as 2012.

The airport is also an Eritrean Air Force base.

Airlines and destinations

References

External links

Airports in Eritrea
Buildings and structures in Asmara
World War II airfields in Italian Eritrea
Airfields of the United States Army Air Forces Air Transport Command in Central and South Africa
Airfields of the United States Army Air Forces
Airports established in 1922
Italian Eritrea
Modernist architecture in Eritrea